Pamir Kabul F.C. is a football team in Afghanistan. They play in the Kabul Premier League.

Football clubs in Afghanistan